The anterior interventricular sulcus and posterior interventricular sulcus extend from the base of the ventricular portion to a notch, the notch of cardiac apex, (or incisura apicis cordis) on the acute margin of the heart just to the right of the apex.

References

External links

Cardiac anatomy